Joseph Noel Edwards (born 26 November 1898) was a Welsh professional footballer, who played as a left back. He made 140 appearances in the English Football League for Wrexham.

References

1898 births
Date of death unknown
Welsh footballers
Association football defenders
English Football League players
Wrexham A.F.C. players
Llandudno F.C. players
Oswestry Town F.C. players
Holywell Town F.C. players
Sportspeople from Wrexham County Borough